Fishguard Lifeboat Station (based in Goodwick, Pembrokeshire, Wales) is a Royal National Lifeboat Institution (RNLI) station.

Located on the quay between Fishguard railway station and the northern breakwater, the station is staffed by two crews and has around 30 members. Operating two lifeboats, a  lifeboat Blue Peter VII and an inshore  lifeboat Edward Arthur Richardson, it is one of seven stations with a lifeboat funded by the BBC children's television series Blue Peter.

History 
The station has operated since 1822 and crews have been presented with 29 awards for gallantry including, in 1847, two RNLI Silver Medals to Martha and Margaret Llewellyn. The RNLI took over the station in 1855.

In May 1874 the RNLI awarded the Fishguard lifeboat No.1 crew £27 for their lifesaving services over the previous month; they included saving a total of 17 crew from the schooners J.T.S., Squirrel and Gem and the smack Lerry. On 16 November 1882 the lifeboat attended 15 different vessels and saved 46 lives.

A slipway was built by the Great Western Railway in 1911 for a new boathouse; both were replaced in 1930. The lifeboat Charterhouse (ON563) was on station between 1909 and 1931, during which time her crews saved 47 lives. Her centenary was celebrated in 2009, still afloat and renamed Marian.

In February 1946 White Star was at sea for more than 24 hours in severe weather standing by the broken-down submarine  and helping to rescue her crew.

Fleet

All Weather Boats

Inshore Lifeboats

Awards
A number of RNLI awards have been made for outstanding achievements during lifeboat services -
 1847: Silver Medals awarded to Martha and Margaret Llewellyn
 6 other Silver Medals were awarded between 1834 and 1855
 1873 to 1877: 3 Silver Medals to Coxswain James White for his part in saving 80 lives
 1874: Thanks of the Institution inscribed on vellum to Captain W. Harries, W Jenkins and J.G. Annal
 1921: Gold Medal to John Howells, Silver Medals to T.O. Davies, R.E. Simpson and T. Holmes for rescuing 7 from schooner Hermina; 9 other crew members received Bronze Medals for the same service

See also
 Royal National Lifeboat Institution
 List of RNLI stations

References

External links
 Fishguard lifeboat station at the RNLI website
 1967 historic film showing the launch of Howard Marryat from 6:21

Lifeboat stations in Wales
Lifeboat
Transport infrastructure completed in 1822
1822 establishments in Wales